Mahakuma is an administrative division, which is denoting a sub-district.

Subdivisions of Bangladesh

Mahakuma was a term of administration under district containing some sub-district (Thana or upazilas) under a district of Bangladesh. The Local Government Ordinance of 1982 abolished the "Mahakuma" as an administrative tier and then existing Mahakumas  have been re-designated and upgraded as new districts.

See also
 Districts of Bangladesh
 Subdivisions of India

Administrative divisions of India
Former subdivisions of Bangladesh